Aglaia perviridis is a species of plant in the family Meliaceae. It is found in Bangladesh, Bhutan, China, India, Malaysia, Thailand, and Vietnam.

References

perviridis
Vulnerable plants
Taxonomy articles created by Polbot